myExperiment is a social web site for researchers sharing research objects such as scientific workflows.

The myExperiment website was launched in November 2007 and contains a significant collection of scientific workflows for a variety of workflow systems, most notably Taverna, but also other tools such as Bioclipse. myExperiment has a REST API and is based on an open source Ruby on Rails codebase. It supports Linked data and has a SPARQL Endpoint, with an interactive tutorial.

The myExperiment project is directed by David De Roure at University of Oxford and is one of the activities of the myGrid consortium led by Carole Goble of The University of Manchester, UK and of the e-Research South UK regional consortium led by the Oxford e-Research Centre. It was originally funded by Jisc under the Virtual Research Environment programme and by the Microsoft Technical Computing Initiative. myExperiment is being enhanced by the workflows for ever project (Wf4Ever) which aims to provide new features to support the preservation of Research Objects in conjunction with the dLibra digital library framework.

References

Biological databases
Jisc
MediaWiki websites
Department of Computer Science, University of Manchester
Science and technology in Greater Manchester